Mapper may refer to:

Computers
 MAPPER, a Fourth-generation programming language originally sold by Sperry Corporation (now Unisys)
 Mapper(2), a biological database

-OR-
 DataMapper, a software library written in the Ruby language
 Device mapper, handler for Linux
 Data mapper pattern, a software engineering architectural term
 Global Mapper, a Global Information System software package developed by Blue Marble Geographics that runs on Microsoft Windows
 Memory management controller, a chip that handles bank switching on certain NES cartridges, or the part of an emulator that emulates a Memory Management Controller
 Moo Mapper, an editor for the IPL file format. It has been developed for the purpose of modifying maps in recent Grand Theft Auto series games for the PC
 Object-relational mapping, a computer science programming technique
 Port mapper, maps program to web address
 Semantic mapper, maps between namespaces

Other
 Level designer, a person who designs levels for video games
 Moon Mineralogy Mapper, one of two instruments that NASA contributed to India's first mission to the Moon, Chandrayaan-1, launched October 22, 2008
 Thematic Mapper, one of the Earth observing sensors introduced in the Landsat program
 Wisconsin H-Alpha Mapper, a custom-built 0.6 metres (24 in) telescope operated by the University of Wisconsin–Madison, used to study the Helium-alpha ions of the warm ionized medium